"Bedrock Anthem" is a song by "Weird Al" Yankovic which was featured on his 1993 album Alapalooza. It is a parody of "Under the Bridge" and "Give It Away", both by the Red Hot Chili Peppers and features the same funk rock musical style. The song also appears on the soundtrack album for the 1994 live-action movie version of The Flintstones, with a portion of the song played during the end credits.

This was the second time Yankovic used two songs by a band in one parody, the first being "The Plumbing Song", which was a parody of Milli Vanilli's "Baby Don't Forget My Number" and "Blame It on the Rain". "Bedrock Anthem" included clips from the actual Flintstones cartoon and, after being a part of Alapalooza, was also included in the compilation album The Essential "Weird Al" Yankovic.

Track listing
 "Bedrock Anthem" – 3:41
 "Young, Dumb & Ugly" – 4:24

Lyrics
The song portrays the narrator's desire to live in Bedrock, the setting of TV's The Flintstones, citing such perks as being the first Rolling Stone subscriber. The song features an audio clip of The Flintstones, which makes a corresponding appearance in the video.

Yankovic stated that, "I knew there was a Flintstones movie coming out, and I figured that for once I'd have my song out before the actual phenomenon. So I got to predate the movie by seven months. I'd always wanted to do a tribute to the Flintstones because I think they're a big part of pop culture. I did a lot of research, really immersed myself in the Flintstones. I watched over 100 Flintstones episodes, because I had to not only re-familiarize myself with the characters, I had to find actual sound bites and animation from the series to use in the song and the video."

Music video

The video for "Bedrock Anthem" begins as a parody of the "Under the Bridge" video during the song's slow introduction, before shifting to a parody of the "Give it Away" video for the remainder of the song. For this latter part, Yankovic and his band found what they believed was the exact spot that the Red Hot Chili Peppers has used, including notable landmarks including a bush of which Flea had performed in front. The music video was Yankovic's full video directing debut, following from the short segment from the end of his 1986's "Christmas at Ground Zero" video.

In the "Under the Bridge" section, parodies include:
The Bee Girl from the Blind Melon video "No Rain" is tap dancing onstage. Guitarist Jim West pokes her, causing her to fall, while he replaces her and begins to play she tries to climb onto the stage again, but he uses his foot to push her off.
Jim West is dressed similar to John Frusciante.
Yankovic replaces Anthony Kiedis, shirtless, with a long brown wig similar to Kiedis' hair.
Yankovic has several tattoos on his arm, including one of Pebbles and another of Wilma. This is an obvious pastiche of Kiedis's many tattoos.
A drawn image of Bedrock replaces the photo of Los Angeles.

The video then quickly segues into a parody of "Give it Away":
Dick Van Patten appears in this video, as he did in "Smells Like Nirvana".
Jon Schwartz replaces Chad Smith. He is also dressed up like a member of the Loyal Order of Water Buffaloes, complete with hat and club.
Steve Jay appears as Flea.
Black-and-white footage of The Flintstones is intercut with the video.
A monologue from The Flintstones along with accompanying footage is played over the backwards guitar solo.
The band members do crazy things, such as blowing a pinwheel, playing with a slinky, throwing up, playing ring toss with the drummer's fake horns, and playing Twister.
Close-ups of Yankovic's mouth are weirder than the shots of Kiedis' mouth in the original. One shot shows Al performing a chinface. Another two shots show him with false teeth (which look like zippers), as well as oddly vibrant-colored lipstick, which was also featured in the original.
In the split-screen shot of the members jumping, a stone-age majorette, Al's aunt Dot, a sumo wrestler, Dick Van Patten, and a poodle and a bird jump as well.
Near the end, Schwartz is seen with a Mickey Mouse hat on, a parody of Chad Smith's usage of a First World War German military hat.

Reaction from Red Hot Chili Peppers
According to Yankovic's Behind the Music episode, the Red Hot Chili Peppers were not very impressed with the parody, although they approved of Yankovic's work. Bassist Flea later stated:

References

External links

1993 singles
1993 songs
Comedy rock songs
Music videos directed by "Weird Al" Yankovic
Red Hot Chili Peppers
Songs about television
Songs with lyrics by "Weird Al" Yankovic
Songs written by Anthony Kiedis
Songs written by Chad Smith
Songs written by Flea (musician)
Songs written by John Frusciante
The Flintstones
"Weird Al" Yankovic songs